The Aristokrat Group (commonly known as Aristokrat or Aristokrat Group), headquartered in Port Harcourt, is an African Media and Entertainment company, known for housing a record label and music publishing company, digital media company, tour and concert production company and a creative consulting and solutions agency. The company is headed by its Founder, Piriye Isokrari.

Its music, and entertainment units includes, Aristokrat Records, Aristokrat 360, Aristokrat Publishing, and Aristokrat Lifestyle. In 2013, Rio Africa acquired 40% of Aristokrat; in turn, Rio Africa tapped Isokrari to head A&R and operations of 960 Music Group. In 2014, he received $1 million investment from 960 Music Group, to develop four new artists (Kamar, Mojeed, Ozone, and Pucado).

In 2020, Billboard named Aristokrat Group as one of The Gatekeepers of the Nigerian music industry.

History
The company was founded by Piriye Isokrari, in Norman, Oklahoma, while in college before relocation in 2009 to Port Harcourt. Its music division Aristokrat Records, was founded in 2010, for music recording, distribution, and music publishing. In 2014, 960 Music Group, investment $1 million in its Series A round, to help develop four new artists (Kamar, Mojeed, Ozone, and Pucado) signed.

Partnerships

Universal Music France
In May 2020, UMF, announced an exclusive strategic deal with Aristokrat Group. In addition, the jointed partnership with Universal Music Group, includes Aristokrat Records artists, with a label deal with Universal Music France and a publishing deal with Universal Music Publishing, to help launch them into the global market, through Caroline France.

Turntable Charts
In May 2021, Turntable Charts announced its partnership with Aristokrat Group. As the partnership will allow both companies collaborate in the exchange of data and ideas to improve music consumption, documentation, and chart culture in Nigeria. Speaking with Pulse Nigeria, CEO of TurnTable Charts, Adeayo Adebiyi, says "everybody at TurnTable Charts is delighted to announce that Aristokrat Group is endorsing TurnTable Top 50 Nigeria as the foremost and a standard music chart publication in Nigeria."

Boomplay
On 17 March 2021, Boomplay say's, it partnership with UMG’s African labels, will also be supported under the new agreement, and other distributed labels, including Aristokrat.

Artists
Recording artists signed to Aristokrat Group, through Universal Music France, and Aristokrat Records includes:
Jujuboy Star
Ria Sean
Former Acts Signed to its Label includes:

Burna Boy 

Leriq 

Homegrown Ozone 

Mojeed 

Kamar Tachio 

Pucado 

Ceeza Milli 

T’neeya

References 

Entertainment companies established in 2009
Mass media companies established in 2009
Record label distributors
Companies based in Lagos